Laurent Alvarez (born 23 September 1990, in Geneva) is a Swiss former competitive figure skater. He is the 2012 Swiss national champion and competed at three ISU Championships, reaching the free skate at the 2011 European Championships. He was coached by Peter Grütter and retired from competition in 2012.

Programs

Results

References

External links 

 

1990 births
Living people
Swiss male single skaters
Sportspeople from Geneva
Competitors at the 2011 Winter Universiade